Basketligan dam, formerly known as Damligan until 2011–12, is the top professional women's basketball league in Sweden. It began in the 2001–02 season, when it replaced the old Elitserien. The league currently has 14 teams.

History

Champions

Current teams

Champions

List of champions

Awards 

 Most Valuable Player

External links
Profile at eurobasket.com

Sweden
Women's basketball in Sweden
Women
Sports leagues established in 2001
2001 establishments in Sweden
Women's sports leagues in Sweden
Professional sports leagues in Sweden